Smiths Lake, an intermittently closed youthful saline coastal lagoon, is located within the Mid-Coast Council local government area in the Mid North Coast region of New South Wales, Australia.

Features and location

Part of the lake shore is a sandbar that separates the lake from the Tasman Sea. When the Mid-Coast Council deems that the lake water level is too high and may cause flooding to low-lying areas around the lake, a trench is constructed from the lake to the ocean using a bulldozer. This releases water from the lake into the ocean and considerably lowers the lake water level.

Due to the nature of Smiths Lake being a coastal dune lake, or coastal lagoon, it was featured in an American documentary about conservation done by producer Elam Stoltzfus.

The most northern of the Ramsar-protected Myall Lakes are located close to the south of Smiths Lake. However, Smiths Lake does not connect nor is formally part of the Myall Lakes. The southern part of Smiths Lake also forms the northern boundary of the Myall Lakes National Park.

Within Smiths Lake there are three islands; Big Island, Little Island, and Bull Island.

Smiths Lake supported a small but viable commercial fishing industry up until April 2007, when the lake was incorporated into the Port Stephens-Great Lakes Marine Park. Because of this, the western third of Smiths Lake is classed as a Sanctuary Zone and the northeastern area, known as Symes Bay, is classed as Habitat Protection Zone, which means commercial fishing in more than two thirds of the lake is no longer permitted.

See also

 List of lakes of Australia

References

External links
 

Lakes of New South Wales
Mid-Coast Council
Mid North Coast